The 2022 Hull Kingston Rovers season was Hull Kingston Rovers 2022 season, in which they competed in Super League XXVII and the 2022 Challenge Cup. They were coached by Tony Smith until 4 July 2022 and Danny McGuire from 4 July 2022 onwards.

League standings

2022 squad

References

External links 
 
 Hull KR Junior Robins
 Hull KR history

Hull Kingston Rovers seasons
Super League XXVII by club